Indonesia competed in the 2008 Asian Beach Games, held in Bali, Indonesia from October 18 to October 26, 2008.

Indonesia sent a total of 214 athletes that competed on 19 sports.

Medalists

Nations at the 2008 Asian Beach Games
2008
Asian Beach Games